Transcriptional repressor p66-beta is a protein that in humans is encoded by the GATAD2B gene.

Interactions
GATAD2B has been shown to interact with Methyl-CpG-binding domain protein 2, MBD3, RBBP7 and RBBP4.

References

Further reading